Project MKUltra (or MK-Ultra) was an illegal human experimentation program designed and undertaken by the U.S. Central Intelligence Agency (CIA), intended to develop procedures and identify drugs that could be used in interrogations to weaken individuals and force confessions through brainwashing and psychological torture. It began in 1953 and was halted in 1973. MKUltra used numerous methods to manipulate its subjects' mental states and brain functions, such as the covert administration of high doses of psychoactive drugs (especially LSD) and other chemicals without the subjects' consent, electroshocks, hypnosis, sensory deprivation, isolation, verbal and sexual abuse, and other forms of torture.

MKUltra was preceded by two drug-related experiments, Project Bluebird and Project ARTICHOKE. It was organized through the CIA's Office of Scientific Intelligence and coordinated with the United States Army Biological Warfare Laboratories. The program engaged in illegal activities, including the use of U.S. and Canadian citizens as unwitting test subjects. Over 7,000 American veterans took part in these experiments non-consensually during the 1950s through 1970s, many of them suing later on. MKUltra's scope was broad, with activities carried out under the guise of research at more than 80 institutions aside from the military, including colleges and universities, hospitals, prisons, and pharmaceutical companies. The CIA operated using front organizations, although some top officials at these institutions were aware of the CIA's involvement.

MKUltra was first brought to public attention in 1975 by the Church Committee of the United States Congress and Gerald Ford's United States President's Commission on CIA activities within the United States (also known as the Rockefeller Commission). Investigative efforts were hampered by CIA Director Richard Helms's order that all MKUltra files be destroyed in 1973; the Church Committee and Rockefeller Commission investigations relied on the sworn testimony of direct participants and on the small number of documents that survived Helms's order. In 1977, a Freedom of Information Act request uncovered a cache of 20,000 documents relating to MKUltra, which led to Senate hearings. Some surviving information about MKUltra was declassified in July 2001.

Background

Origin of project
According to Stephen Kinzer, the CIA project "was a continuation of the work begun in WWII-era Japanese facilities and Nazi concentration camps on subduing and controlling human minds." Kinzer writes that MKUltra's use of mescaline on unwitting subjects was a practice that Nazi doctors had begun in the camps at Auschwitz and Dachau. Kinzer gives evidence of the continuation of a Nazi agenda, citing the CIA's secret recruitment of Nazi torturers and vivisectionists to continue experimenting on thousands of subjects, and Nazis were brought to Fort Detrick, Maryland, to instruct CIA officers on the lethal uses of sarin gas. 

The Soviet Union also contributed greatly to the motivation for this project; according to CIA director Allen Dulles, fear of "Soviet brain perversion techniques" was palpable. The CIA wanted to verse itself in this type of "mind control" to be able to recognize and use it in case of a conflict with the USSR. Fear of the enemy ran rampant among Americans, especially upon the sharp increase in PTSD in Korean prisoners of war. The damage incurred on these survivors was so severe that mind control was thought to be the culprit.

Origin of cryptonym
Other related cryptonyms include Project MKNAOMI and Project MKDELTA. MKDELTA was established to oversee the use of MKUltra materials abroad. According to the Church Committee, "such materials were used on a number of occasions".

Aims and leadership

The project was headed by Sidney Gottlieb but began on the order of CIA director Allen Dulles on April 13, 1953. Its aim was to develop mind-controlling drugs for use against the Soviet bloc in response to alleged Soviet, Chinese, and North Korean use of mind control techniques on U.S. prisoners of war during the Korean War. The CIA wanted to use similar methods on their own captives, and was interested in manipulating foreign leaders with such techniques, devising several schemes to drug Fidel Castro. It often conducted experiments without the subjects' knowledge or consent. In some cases, academic researchers were funded through grants from CIA front organizations but were unaware that the CIA was using their work for these purposes.

The project attempted to produce a perfect truth drug for interrogating suspected Soviet spies during the Cold War, and to explore other possibilities of mind control. Subproject 54 was the Navy's top-secret "Perfect Concussion" program, which was supposed to use sub-aural frequency blasts to erase memory; the program was never carried out.

Most MKUltra records were destroyed in 1973 by order of CIA director Richard Helms, so it has been difficult for investigators to gain a complete understanding of the more than 150 funded research subprojects sponsored by MKUltra and related CIA programs.

The project began during a period of what English journalist Rupert Cornwell described as "paranoia" at the CIA, when the U.S. had lost its nuclear monopoly and fear of communism was at its height. CIA counter-intelligence chief James Jesus Angleton believed that a mole had penetrated the organization at the highest levels. The agency poured millions of dollars into studies examining ways to influence and control the mind and to enhance its ability to extract information from resistant subjects during interrogation. Some historians assert that one goal of MKUltra and related CIA projects was to create a Manchurian Candidate-style subject. American historian Alfred W. McCoy has claimed that the CIA attempted to focus media attention on these sorts of "ridiculous" programs so that the public would not look at the research's primary goal, which was effective methods of interrogation.

Scale of project
One 1955 MKUltra document gives an indication of the size and range of the effort. It refers to the study of an assortment of mind-altering substances described as follows:

 Substances which will promote illogical thinking and impulsiveness to the point where the recipient would be discredited in public.
 Substances which increase the efficiency of mentation and perception.
 Materials which will prevent or counteract the intoxicating effect of alcohol.
 Materials which will promote the intoxicating effect of alcohol.
 Materials which will produce the signs and symptoms of recognized diseases in a reversible way so they may be used for malingering, etc.
 Materials which will render the induction of hypnosis easier or otherwise enhance its usefulness.
 Substances which will enhance the ability of individuals to withstand privation, torture, and coercion during interrogation and so-called "brain-washing".
 Materials and physical methods which will produce amnesia for events preceding and during their use.
 Physical methods of producing shock and confusion over extended periods of time and capable of surreptitious use.
 Substances which produce physical disablement such as paralysis of the legs, acute anemia, etc.
 Substances which will produce "pure" euphoria with no subsequent let-down.
 Substances which alter personality structure in such a way the tendency of the recipient to become dependent upon another person is enhanced.
 A material which will cause mental confusion of such a type the individual under its influence will find it difficult to maintain a fabrication under questioning.
 Substances which will lower the ambition and general working efficiency of men when administered in undetectable amounts.
 Substances which promote weakness or distortion of the eyesight or hearing faculties, preferably without permanent effects.
 A knockout pill which can be surreptitiously administered in drinks, food, cigarettes, as an aerosol, etc., which will be safe to use, provide a maximum of amnesia, and be suitable for use by agent types on an ad hoc basis.
 A material which can be surreptitiously administered by the above routes and which in very small amounts will make it impossible for a person to perform physical activity.

Applications
The 1976 Church Committee report found that, in the MKDELTA program, "Drugs were used primarily as an aid to interrogations, but MKULTRA/MKDELTA materials were also used for harassment, discrediting or disabling purposes."

Other related projects
In 1964, MKSEARCH was the name given to the continuation of the MKULTRA program. The MKSEARCH program was divided into two projects dubbed MKOFTEN and MKCHICKWIT. Funding for MKSEARCH commenced in 1965, and ended in 1971. The project was a joint project between the U.S. Army Chemical Corps and the CIA's Office of Research and Development to find new offensive-use agents, with a focus on incapacitating agents. Its purpose was to develop, test, and evaluate capabilities in the covert use of biological, chemical, and radioactive material systems and techniques of producing predictable human behavioral and/or physiological changes in support of highly sensitive operational requirements.

By March 1971 over 26,000 potential agents had been acquired for future screening. The CIA was interested in bird migration patterns for chemical and biological warfare (CBW) research; subproject 139 designated "Bird Disease Studies" at Penn State.

MKOFTEN was to deal with testing and toxicological transmissivity and behavioral effects of drugs in animals and, ultimately, humans.

MKCHICKWIT was concerned with acquiring information on new drug developments in Europe and Asia, and with acquiring samples.

Experiments on Americans
CIA documents suggest that they investigated "chemical, biological, and radiological" methods of mind control as part of MKUltra. They spent an estimated $10 million or more, roughly $87.5 million adjusted for inflation.

LSD
Early CIA efforts focused on LSD-25, which later came to dominate many of MKUltra's programs. The CIA wanted to know if they could make Soviet spies defect against their will and whether the Soviets could do the same to the CIA's own operatives.

Documents obtained from the CIA by John D. Marks under Freedom of Information in 1976 showed that, in 1953, the CIA considered purchasing 10 kilograms of LSD, enough for 100 million doses. The proposed purchase aimed to stop other countries from controlling the supply. The documents showed that the CIA purchased some quantities of LSD from Sandoz Laboratories in Switzerland.

Once Project MKUltra got underway in April 1953, experiments included administering LSD to mental patients, prisoners, drug addicts, and prostitutes – "people who could not fight back," as one agency officer put it. In one case, they administered LSD to a mental patient in Kentucky for 174 days. They also administered LSD to CIA employees, military personnel, doctors, other government agents, and members of the general public to study their reactions. The aim was to find drugs that would bring out deep confessions or wipe a subject's mind clean and program them as "a robot agent." Military personnel who received the mind-altering drugs were also threatened with court-martials if they told anyone about the experiments. LSD and other drugs were often administered without the subject's knowledge or informed consent, a violation of the Nuremberg Code the U.S. had agreed to follow after World War II. Many veterans who were subjected to experimentation are now seeking legal and monetary reparations. 

In Operation Midnight Climax, the CIA set up several brothels within agency safehouses in San Francisco to obtain a selection of men who would be too embarrassed to talk about the events. The men were dosed with LSD, the brothels were equipped with one-way mirrors, and the sessions were filmed for later viewing and study. In other experiments where people were given LSD without their knowledge, they were interrogated under bright lights with doctors in the background taking notes. They told subjects they would extend their "trips" if they refused to reveal their secrets. The people under this interrogation were CIA employees, U.S. military personnel, and agents suspected of working for the other side in the Cold War. Long-term debilitation and several deaths resulted from this. Heroin addicts were bribed into taking LSD with offers of more heroin.

At the invitation of Stanford psychology graduate student Vik Lovell, an acquaintance of Richard Alpert and Allen Ginsberg, Ken Kesey volunteered to take part in what turned out to be a CIA-financed study under the aegis of MKUltra, at the Menlo Park Veterans' Hospital where he worked as a night aide. The project studied the effects of psychoactive drugs, particularly LSD, psilocybin, mescaline, cocaine, AMT and DMT on people.

The Office of Security used LSD in interrogations, but Sidney Gottlieb, the chemist who directed MKUltra, had other ideas: he thought it could be used in covert operations. Since its effects were temporary, he believed it could be given to high-ranking officials and in this way affect the course of important meetings, speeches, etc. Since he realized there was a difference in testing the drug in a laboratory and using it in clandestine operations, he initiated a series of experiments where LSD was given to people in "normal" settings without warning. At first, everyone in Technical Services tried it; a typical experiment involved two people in a room where they observed each other for hours and took notes. As the experimentation progressed, a point arrived where outsiders were drugged with no explanation whatsoever and surprise acid trips became something of an occupational hazard among CIA operatives. Adverse reactions often occurred, such as an operative who received the drug in his morning coffee, became psychotic and ran across Washington, seeing a monster in every car passing him. The experiments continued even after Frank Olson, an army chemist who had never taken LSD, was covertly dosed by his CIA supervisor and nine days later plunged to his death from the window of a 13th-story New York City hotel room, supposedly as a result of deep depression induced by the drug. According to Stephen Kinzer, Olson had approached his superiors some time earlier, doubting the morality of the project, and asked to resign from the CIA.

Some subjects' participation was consensual, and in these cases they appeared to be singled out for even more extreme experiments. In one case, seven drug-addicted African-American volunteers at the  National Institute of Mental Health Addiction Research Center in Kentucky were given LSD for seventy-seven consecutive days.

MKUltra's researchers later dismissed LSD as too unpredictable in its results. They gave up on the notion that LSD was "the secret that was going to unlock the universe," but it still had a place in the cloak-and-dagger arsenal. However, by 1962 the CIA and the army developed a series of super-hallucinogens such as the highly touted BZ, which was thought to hold greater promise as a mind control weapon. This resulted in the withdrawal of support by many academics and private researchers, and LSD research became less of a priority altogether.

Other drugs
Another technique investigated was the intravenous administration of a barbiturate into one arm and an amphetamine into the other. The barbiturates were released into the person first, and as soon as the person began to fall asleep, the amphetamines were released. 
Other experiments involved heroin, morphine, temazepam (used under code name MKSEARCH), mescaline, psilocybin, scopolamine, alcohol and sodium pentothal.

Hypnosis
Declassified MKUltra documents indicate they studied hypnosis in the early 1950s. Experimental goals included creating "hypnotically induced anxieties", "hypnotically increasing ability to learn and recall complex written matter", studying hypnosis and polygraph examinations, "hypnotically increasing ability to observe and recall complex arrangements of physical objects", and studying "relationship of personality to susceptibility to hypnosis". They conducted experiments with drug-induced hypnosis and with anterograde and retrograde amnesia while under the influence of such drugs.

Experiments on Canadians

The CIA exported experiments to Canada when they recruited British psychiatrist Donald Ewen Cameron, creator of the "psychic driving" concept, which the CIA found interesting. Cameron had been hoping to correct schizophrenia by erasing existing memories and reprogramming the psyche. He commuted from Albany, New York to Montreal every week to work at the Allan Memorial Institute of McGill University, and was paid $69,000 from 1957 to 1964 (US$579,480 in 2021, adjusted for inflation) to carry out MKUltra experiments there, the Montreal experiments. These research funds were sent to Cameron by a CIA front organization, the Society for the Investigation of Human Ecology, and as shown in internal CIA documents, Cameron did not know the money came from the CIA.

In addition to LSD, Cameron also experimented with various paralytic drugs as well as electroconvulsive therapy at thirty to forty times the normal power. His "driving" experiments consisted of putting subjects into drug-induced comas for weeks at a time (up to three months in one case) while playing tape loops of noise or simple repetitive statements. His experiments were often carried out on patients who entered the institute for common problems such as anxiety disorders and postpartum depression, many of whom suffered permanent effects from his actions. His treatments resulted in victims' urinary incontinence, amnesia, forgetting how to talk, forgetting their parents and thinking their interrogators were their parents.

During this era, Cameron became known worldwide as the first chairman of the World Psychiatric Association as well as president of both the American Psychiatric Association and the Canadian Psychiatric Association. Cameron was also a member of the Nuremberg medical tribunal in 1946–1947.

Motivation and assessments
His work was inspired and paralleled by the British psychiatrist William Sargant at St Thomas' Hospital, London, and Belmont Hospital, Sutton, who was also involved in the Secret Intelligence Service and who experimented on his patients without their consent, causing similar long-term damage.

In the 1980s, several of Cameron's former patients sued the CIA for damages, which the Canadian news program The Fifth Estate documented. Their experiences and lawsuit were adapted in the 1998 television miniseries The Sleep Room.

Naomi Klein argues in her book The Shock Doctrine that Cameron's research and his contribution to the MKUltra project was not about mind control and brainwashing, but about designing "a scientifically based system for extracting information from 'resistant sources'. In other words, torture."

Alfred W. McCoy writes, "Stripped of its bizarre excesses, Dr. Cameron's experiments, building upon Donald O. Hebb's earlier breakthrough, laid the scientific foundation for the CIA's two-stage psychological torture method", referring to first creating a state of disorientation in the subject, and then creating a situation of "self-inflicted" discomfort in which the disoriented subject can alleviate pain by capitulating.

Experiments on Danes
Unlike the US and Canada, Denmark had a centralized population register, allowing participants to be tracked over the course of several years. U.S. psychologist Zarnoff Mednick teamed up with Danish professor Fini Schulsinger to study schizophrenia progression in Danish orphans. The project grew out of QKHilltop and was later absorbed into MKUltra. In 1977, Schulsinger completed his doctoral dissertation on the project, but as MKUltra had been officially declared in the U.S. to have been discontinued with records destroyed, Schulsinger's thesis became a state secret. The children were required to undergo frequent and harsh mental health assessments for which there was no informed consent. In December 2021, radio documentarian Per Wennick discovered 36 boxes of MKUltra records stored at a psychiatric center in a Copenhagen suburb, but when he asked for access, the center shredded the records, in violation of Danish law.

Secret detention camps
In areas under American control in the early 1950s in Europe and East Asia, mostly Japan, Germany and the Philippines, the CIA created secret detention centers so that the U.S. could avoid criminal prosecution. The CIA captured people suspected of being enemy agents and other people it deemed "expendable" to undertake various types of torture and human experimentation on them. The prisoners were interrogated while being administered psychoactive drugs, electroshocked and subjected to extremes of temperature, sensory isolation and the like to develop a better understanding of how to destroy and to control human minds.

Revelation

In 1973, amid a government-wide panic caused by Watergate, CIA Director Richard Helms ordered all MKUltra files destroyed. Pursuant to this order, most CIA documents regarding the project were destroyed, making a full investigation of MKUltra impossible. A cache of some 20,000 documents survived Helms's purge, as they had been incorrectly stored in a financial records building and were discovered following a FOIA request in 1977. These documents were fully investigated during the Senate Hearings of 1977.

In December 1974, The New York Times alleged that the CIA had conducted illegal domestic activities, including experiments on U.S. citizens, during the 1960s. That report prompted investigations by the United States Congress, in the form of the Church Committee, and by a commission known as the Rockefeller Commission that looked into the illegal domestic activities of the CIA, the FBI and intelligence-related agencies of the military.

In the summer of 1975, congressional Church Committee reports and the presidential Rockefeller Commission report revealed to the public for the first time that the CIA and the Department of Defense had conducted experiments on both unwitting and cognizant human subjects as part of an extensive program to find out how to influence and control human behavior through the use of psychoactive drugs such as LSD and mescaline and other chemical, biological, and psychological means. They also revealed that at least one subject, Frank Olson, had died after administration of LSD. Much of what the Church Committee and the Rockefeller Commission learned about MKUltra was contained in a report, prepared by the Inspector General's office in 1963, that had survived the destruction of records ordered in 1973. However, it contained little detail. Sidney Gottlieb, who had retired from the CIA two years previously and had headed MKUltra, was interviewed by the committee but claimed to have very little recollection of the activities of MKUltra.

The congressional committee investigating the CIA research, chaired by Senator Frank Church, concluded that "prior consent was obviously not obtained from any of the subjects." The committee noted that the "experiments sponsored by these researchers ... call into question the decision by the agencies not to fix guidelines for experiments."

Following the recommendations of the Church Committee, President Gerald Ford in 1976 issued the first Executive Order on Intelligence Activities which, among other things, prohibited "experimentation with drugs on human subjects, except with the informed consent, in writing and witnessed by a disinterested party, of each such human subject" and in accordance with the guidelines issued by the National Commission. Subsequent orders by Presidents Carter and Reagan expanded the directive to apply to any human experimentation.

In 1977, during a hearing held by the Senate Select Committee on Intelligence, to look further into MKUltra, Admiral Stansfield Turner, then Director of Central Intelligence, revealed that the CIA had found a set of records, consisting of about 20,000 pages, that had survived the 1973 destruction orders because they had been incorrectly stored at a records center not usually used for such documents. These files dealt with the financing of MKUltra projects and contained few project details, but much more was learned from them than from the Inspector General's 1963 report.

On the Senate floor in 1977, Senator Ted Kennedy said:

The Deputy Director of the CIA revealed that over thirty universities and institutions were involved in an "extensive testing and experimentation" program which included covert drug tests on unwitting citizens "at all social levels, high and low, native Americans and foreign." Several of these tests involved the administration of LSD to "unwitting subjects in social situations.

At least one death, the result of the alleged defenestration of Frank Olson, was attributed to Olson's being subjected, without his knowledge, to such experimentation nine days before his death. The CIA itself subsequently acknowledged that these tests had little scientific rationale. The officers conducting the monitoring were not qualified scientific observers.

In Canada, the issue took much longer to surface, becoming widely known in 1984 on a CBC news show, The Fifth Estate. It was learned that not only had the CIA funded Cameron's efforts, but also that the Canadian government was fully aware of this, and had later provided another $500,000 in funding to continue the experiments. This revelation largely derailed efforts by the victims to sue the CIA as their U.S. counterparts had, and the Canadian government eventually settled out of court for $100,000 to each of the 127 victims. Cameron died on September 8, 1967, after suffering a heart attack while he and his son were mountain climbing. None of Cameron's personal records of his involvement with MKUltra survived because his family destroyed them after his death.

1994 U.S. General Accounting Office report
The U.S. General Accounting Office issued a report on September 28, 1994, which stated that between 1940 and 1974, Department of Defense and other national security agencies studied thousands of human subjects in tests and experiments involving hazardous substances.

The quote from the study:

Working with the CIA, the Department of Defense gave hallucinogenic drugs to thousands of "volunteer" soldiers in the 1950s and 1960s. In addition to LSD, the Army also tested quinuclidinyl benzilate, a hallucinogen code-named BZ. (Note 37) Many of these tests were conducted under the so-called MKULTRA program, established to counter perceived Soviet and Chinese advances in brainwashing techniques. Between 1953 and 1964, the program consisted of 149 projects involving drug testing and other studies on unwitting human subjects

Deaths
Given the CIA's purposeful destruction of most records, its failure to follow informed consent protocols with thousands of participants, the uncontrolled nature of the experiments, and the lack of follow-up data, the full impact of MKUltra experiments, including deaths, may never be known.

Several known deaths have been associated with Project MKUltra, most notably that of Frank Olson. Olson, a United States Army biochemist and biological weapons researcher, was given LSD without his knowledge or consent in November 1953, as part of a CIA experiment, and died after falling from a 13th-story window a week later. A CIA doctor assigned to monitor Olson claimed to have been asleep in another bed in a New York City hotel room when Olson fell to his death. In 1953, Olson's death was described as a suicide that had occurred during a severe psychotic episode. The CIA's own internal investigation concluded that the head of MKUltra, CIA chemist Sidney Gottlieb, had conducted the LSD experiment with Olson's prior knowledge, although neither Olson nor the other men taking part in the experiment were informed as to the exact nature of the drug until some 20 minutes after its ingestion. The report further suggested that Gottlieb was nonetheless due a reprimand, as he had failed to take into account Olson's already-diagnosed suicidal tendencies, which might have been exacerbated by the LSD.

The Olson family disputes the official version of events. They maintain that Frank Olson was murdered because, especially in the aftermath of his LSD experience, he had become a security risk who might divulge state secrets associated with highly classified CIA programs, about many of which he had direct personal knowledge. A few days before his death, Frank Olson quit his position as acting chief of the Special Operations Division at Detrick, Maryland (later Fort Detrick) because of a severe moral crisis concerning the nature of his biological weapons research. Among Olson's concerns were the development of assassination materials used by the CIA, the CIA's use of biological warfare materials in covert operations, experimentation with biological weapons in populated areas, collaboration with former Nazi scientists under Operation Paperclip, LSD mind-control research, and the use of psychoactive drugs during "terminal" interrogations under a program code-named Project ARTICHOKE. Later forensic evidence conflicted with the official version of events; when Olson's body was exhumed in 1994, cranial injuries indicated that Olson had been knocked unconscious before he exited the window. The medical examiner termed Olson's death a "homicide". In 1975, Olson's family received a $750,000 settlement from the U.S. government and formal apologies from President Gerald Ford and CIA Director William Colby, though their apologies were limited to informed consent issues concerning Olson's ingestion of LSD. On 28 November 2012, the Olson family filed suit against the U.S. federal government for the wrongful death of Frank Olson. The case was dismissed in July 2013, due in part to the 1976 settlement between the family and government. In the decision dismissing the suit, U.S. District Judge James Boasberg wrote, "While the court must limit its analysis to the four corners of the complaint, the skeptical reader may wish to know that the public record supports many of the allegations [in the family's suit], farfetched as they may sound."

A 2010 book by H. P. Albarelli Jr. alleged that the 1951 Pont-Saint-Esprit mass poisoning was part of MKDELTA, that Olson was involved in that event, and that he was eventually murdered by the CIA. However, academic sources attribute the incident to ergot poisoning through a local bakery.

Legal issues involving informed consent

The revelations about the CIA and the army prompted a number of subjects or their survivors to file lawsuits against the federal government for conducting experiments without informed consent. Although the government aggressively, and sometimes successfully, sought to avoid legal liability, several plaintiffs did receive compensation through court order, out-of-court settlement, or acts of Congress. Frank Olson's family received $750,000 by a special act of Congress, and both President Ford and CIA director William Colby met with Olson's family to apologize publicly.

Previously, the CIA and the army had actively and successfully sought to withhold incriminating information, even as they secretly provided compensation to the families. One subject of army drug experimentation, James Stanley, an army sergeant, brought an important, albeit unsuccessful, suit. The government argued that Stanley was barred from suing under the Feres doctrine.

In 1987, the Supreme Court affirmed this defense in a 5–4 decision that dismissed Stanley's case: United States v. Stanley. The majority argued that "a test for liability that depends on the extent to which particular suits would call into question military discipline and decision making would itself require judicial inquiry into, and hence intrusion upon, military matters." In dissent, Justice William Brennan argued that the need to preserve military discipline should not protect the government from liability and punishment for serious violations of constitutional rights:

The medical trials at Nuremberg in 1947 deeply impressed upon the world that experimentation with unknowing human subjects is morally and legally unacceptable. The United States Military Tribunal established the Nuremberg Code as a standard against which to judge German scientists who experimented with human subjects.... [I]n defiance of this principle, military intelligence officials ... began surreptitiously testing chemical and biological materials, including LSD.

Justice Sandra Day O'Connor, writing a separate dissent, stated:

No judicially crafted rule should insulate from liability the involuntary and unknowing human experimentation alleged to have occurred in this case. Indeed, as Justice Brennan observes, the United States played an instrumental role in the criminal prosecution of Nazi officials who experimented with human subjects during the Second World War, and the standards that the Nuremberg Military Tribunals developed to judge the behavior of the defendants stated that the 'voluntary consent of the human subject is absolutely essential ... to satisfy moral, ethical, and legal concepts.' If this principle is violated, the very least that society can do is to see that the victims are compensated, as best they can be, by the perpetrators.

In another lawsuit, Wayne Ritchie, a former United States Marshal, after hearing about the project's existence in 1990, alleged the CIA laced his food or drink with LSD at a 1957 Christmas party which resulted in his attempting to commit a robbery at a bar and his subsequent arrest. While the government admitted it was, at that time, drugging people without their consent and that Ritchie's behavior was typical of someone on LSD, U.S. District Judge Marilyn Hall Patel found Ritchie could not prove he was one of MKUltra's victims or that LSD caused his robbery attempt, and dismissed the case in 2005.

Notable people
Experimenters
 Harold Alexander Abramson
 Donald Ewen Cameron
 Sidney Gottlieb
 Harris Isbell
 Martin Theodore Orne
 Louis Jolyon West

Documented subjects
 American poet Allen Ginsberg first took LSD in an experiment on Stanford University's campus where he could listen to records of his choice (he chose a Gertrude Stein reading, a Tibetan mandala, and Richard Wagner). He said the experience resulted in "a slight paranoia that hung on all my acid experiences through the mid-1960s until I learned from meditation how to disperse that." He became an outspoken advocate for psychedelics in the 1960s and, after hearing suspicions that the experiment was CIA-funded, wrote, "Am I, Allen Ginsberg, the product of one of the CIA's lamentable, ill-advised, or triumphantly successful experiments in mind control?" 
Ken Kesey, author of One Flew Over the Cuckoo's Nest, is said to have volunteered for MKUltra experiments involving LSD and other psychedelic drugs at the Veterans Administration Hospital in Menlo Park while he was a student at nearby Stanford University. Kesey's experiences while under the influence of LSD inspired him to promote the drug outside the context of the MKUltra experiments, which influenced the early development of hippie culture.
Robert Hunter was an American lyricist, singer-songwriter, translator, and poet, best known for his association with Jerry Garcia and the Grateful Dead. Along with Ken Kesey, Hunter was said to be an early volunteer MKUltra test subject at Stanford University. Stanford test subjects were paid to take LSD, psilocybin, and mescaline, then report on their experiences. These experiences were creatively formative for Hunter: 

Alleged subjects
 Boston mobster James "Whitey" Bulger alleged he had been subjected to weekly injections of LSD and subsequent testing while in prison in Atlanta in 1957.
 Ted Kaczynski, an American domestic terrorist known as the Unabomber, was said to be a subject of a voluntary psychological study alleged by some sources to have been a part of MKUltra. As a sophomore at Harvard, Kaczynski participated in a study described by author Alston Chase as a "purposely brutalizing psychological experiment", led by Harvard psychologist Henry Murray.  In total, Kaczynski spent 200 hours as part of the study.
 Lawrence Teeter, the attorney for Sirhan Sirhan, believed that Sirhan was "operating under MK-ULTRA mind control techniques" when he assassinated Robert F. Kennedy.
 Charles Manson has been tied to MKULTRA by author Tom O'Neil, beginning with his time in prison, when Manson took part in drug-induced psychological experiments run by the federal government. This continued through his ongoing connection to the CIA's Free Medical Clinic in San Francisco once out of prison in 1967.

Aftermath
After retiring in 1972, Gottlieb dismissed his entire effort for the CIA's MKUltra program as useless. The CIA insists that MKUltra-type experiments have been abandoned.

In popular culture

MKUltra plays a part in many conspiracy theories due to its nature and the destruction of most records.

Music
 The seventh track on Muse's 2009 album The Resistance is titled MK Ultra.

Television
 The 1998 CBC miniseries The Sleep Room dramatizes brainwashing experiments funded by MKUltra that were performed on Canadian mental patients in the 1950s and 60s, and their subsequent efforts to sue the CIA.
 In season 2, episode 19 of Bones, "Spaceman in a Crater", Jack Hodgins mentions that Frank Olson was an unwitting participant and committed suicide, but that an exhumation 45 years later proved he was murdered.
Wormwood is a 2017 American six-part docudrama miniseries directed by Errol Morris and released on Netflix. The series is based on the life of the scientist Frank Olson and his involvement in Project MKUltra.
Stranger Things contains several fictional characters related to the MKUltra project, such as Eleven, Kali, and Henry Creel.

Video games
 Call of Duty: Black Ops and Call of Duty: Black Ops Cold War feature characters subjected to the MKUltra Program, primarily Alex Mason and Bell.

Movies 

 MK Ultra is a movie released in 2022 based on the experiments of Project MK Ultra. It follows a psychologist played by Anson Mount as he descends into the government conspiracy of the CIA's experiments.

See also
United States
 CIA activities in the United States
 Unethical human experimentation in the United States
International
 Allegations of CIA drug trafficking
 Human radiation experiments
 Human rights violations by the CIA
 Poison laboratory of the Soviet secret services
 Unit 731 (Japan)
Operations
 :Category:Central Intelligence Agency operations
 MKCHICKWIT
 MKOFTEN
Other
 Montauk Project
 Harold Blauer – a man who died within project MK-Ultra as a result of a 3,4-methylenedioxyamphetamine injection.

Notes

References

Further reading
 
 Poisoner in Chief: Sidney Gottlieb and the CIA Search for Mind Control, Henry Holt and Co., by Stephen Kinzer, 2019, 
 The Secret History of Fort Detrick, the CIA's Base for Mind Control Experiments, by Stephen Kinzer, Politico, 2019.
 
 
 
 
 Acid: The Secret History of LSD, by David Black, London: Vision, 1998, . Later edition exists.
 Acid Dreams: The Complete Social History of LSD: The CIA, the Sixties, and Beyond by Martin Lee and Bruce Shlain, New York: Grove Press, 1985, 
 The Agency: The Rise and Decline of the CIA, by John Ranelagh, pp. 208–10.
 80 Greatest Conspiracies of All Time, by Jonathan Vankin and John Whalin, chapter 1, "CIAcid Drop".
 In the Sleep Room: The Story of CIA Brainwashing Experiments in Canada, Anne Collins, Lester & Orpen Dennys (Toronto), 1988.
 Journey into Madness: The True Story of Secret CIA Mind Control and Medical Abuse, by Gordon Thomas, NY: Bantam, 1989, 
 Operation Mind Control: Our Secret Government's War Against Its Own People, by W H Bowart, New York: Dell, 1978, 
 The Men Who Stare at Goats, by Jon Ronson, Picador, 2004, 
 The Search for the Manchurian Candidate, by John Marks, W.W. Norton & Company Ltd, 1999, 
 Storming Heaven: LSD and The American Dream, by Jay Stevens, New York: Grove Press, 1987,

External links

 Entire Four CD-ROM set of CIA / MKUltra Declassified documents released by the Central Intelligence Agency (CIA), image format, The Black Vault
 MKUltra Declassified documents, PDF format
 U.S. Supreme Court, CIA v. Sims, 471 U.S. 159 (1985) 471 U.S. 159, Findlaw
 U.S. Supreme Court, United States v. Stanley, 483 U.S. 669 (1987) 483 U.S. 669, Findlaw
 Mind Control and MKULTRA by Richard G. Gall
 Results of the 1973 Church Committee Hearings, on CIA misdeeds, and the 1984 Iran/Contra Hearings
 XXVII. Testing and Use of Chemical and Biological Agents by the Intelligence Community
 List of MKULTRA Unclassified Documents including subprojects

 
1953 establishments in the United States
Central Intelligence Agency operations
Code names
Cover-ups
Devices to alter consciousness
History of the government of the United States
Human subject research in the United States
Investigations and hearings of the United States Congress
Lysergic acid diethylamide
American medical research
20th-century military history of the United States
Military psychiatry
Mind control
Psychedelic drug research
American secret government programs
Human rights abuses in the United States
Medical experimentation on prisoners
Academic scandals
Torture in the United States
Psychoactive drugs and the military
Clandestine operations
CIA cryptonyms
Medical scandals in the United States